Caminibacter profundus is a species of moderately thermophilic, microaerobic to anaerobic, chemolithoautotrophic bacterium. It is a Gram-negative, non-motile rod, with type strain CRT (=DSM 15016T =JCM 11957T).

References

Further reading

Satyanarayana, T., and B. N. Johri. Microbial diversity: current perspectives and potential applications. IK International Pvt Ltd, 2005.

Mohapatra, Pradipta K. Textbook of environmental microbiology. IK International Pvt Ltd, 2008.

External links

LPSN
Type strain of Caminibacter profundus at BacDive -  the Bacterial Diversity Metadatabase

Campylobacterota
Bacteria described in 2004